Irina Ruslyakova (Russian: Ирина Руслякова; born 12 September 1975) is a badminton player from Russia. She competed in badminton at the 2000 Summer Olympics in women's doubles with partner Marina Yakusheva. Ruslyakova won a bronze medal in the women's doubles at the 2000 European Championships.

References

1975 births
Living people
Olympic badminton players of Russia
Badminton players at the 2000 Summer Olympics
Russian female badminton players
Sportspeople from Vladivostok